Arena and Convention Centre Liverpool, also known as simply ACC Liverpool is a multi-purpose event complex on the former Kings Dock, Liverpool, England. Opened in May 2008, it is part of Liverpool's event campus, consisting of an interconnected arena, convention and exhibition centre, positioned on the banks of Liverpool's heritage waterfront. 

In 2016, the four-star Pullman Liverpool Hotel was opened within the complex, offering luxury accommodation with its 216 bedrooms.

History

ACC Liverpool was officially opened by Her Majesty Queen Elizabeth II and Prince Philip on 22 May 2008.

On the evening of 31 December 2017, a fire broke out in the car park and as a consequence, the Liverpool International Horse Show, taking place at the arena, had to be cancelled. The horses were safely evacuated from temporary stabling built on the ground floor level of the car park, and held on the arena floor and the land surrounding the building. The fire continued into the small hours of 1 January 2018. The structure had to be demolished later and cars were removed. Virtually all of the 1,400 cars there were destroyed, but no serious harm to people or horses was reported.

Facilities

The building, designed by Wilkinson Eyre, Sport Concepts and Buro Happold, has a 3,725 square metre multipurpose hall on the ground floor, with a 1,350 capacity auditorium and 21 break out rooms above. 

Large events can take advantage of the Liverpool event campus' interconnected facilities. By using the connecting lower Galleria, it is possible to extend exhibitions into the arena's 3,400m2 open floor area. This gives a total exhibition floor space of 7,125m2. 

Exhibition Centre Liverpool, connected by a covered bridge, gives an additional 8,100m2 of multi-purpose exhibition space. The exhibition centre is also linked internally to the onsite 4* Pullman Liverpool hotel. 

The John Lennon Peace Monument is on the waterfront adjacent to ACC Liverpool.

References

External links

Buildings and structures in Liverpool
Exhibition and conference centres in England
Redevelopment projects in Liverpool